"Oh My Soul" is a 1958 song by Little Richard.

Oh My Soul may also refer to:

"O My Soul", a 1974 song by Big Star from Radio City
"Oh My Soul", a 1976 song by Crystal Gale from Crystal
"Oh My Soul", a 1978 song by Garland Jeffreys from One-Eyed Jack
"Oh My Soul!", a 1999 song by Thrush Hermit from Clayton Park
"Oh My Soul", a 2003 by Keith Getty and Margaret Becker from New Irish Hymns 2
"Oh My Soul", a 2006 song by Edie Brickell & New Bohemians from Stranger Things